Zahir-al-Din Abu-al-Fazl Tahir ibn Muhammad mostly known as Zahir Faryabi was a 12th-century Persian poet. He was born in Faryab (in today's Afghanistan). His works mostly consist of Qasidas for several Seljuq Emirs. He died in 1201 CE in Tabriz.

He dedicated at least one poem to the Shirvanshah Akhsitan I.

References and notes

References
 
Jan Rypka, History of Iranian Literature. Reidel Publishing Company. 1968 . 
J.T.P. de Bruijn, "FĀRYĀBĪ, ẒAHĪR-AL-DĪN ABU’L-FAŻL ṬĀHER" in Encyclopædia Iranica 
 

12th-century Persian-language poets
13th-century Iranian writers
Poets from the Seljuk Empire
Burials in Maqbaratoshoara
People from Faryab Province
Poets of the Shirvanshahs